Cas Holman (born 1974) is an American toy designer. He is known for designing toys that emphasize creativity through unstructured play.

Holman's Rigamajig line of collaborative playsets, originating as a custom play feature for the High Line Park in 2011, has been included in schools and museum play areas internationally. Previously a professor at Syracuse University, he is currently a professor at the Rhode Island School of Design and the founder and principal designer of the toy company Heroes Will Rise.
 
Holman is the subject of an episode of the Netflix series Abstract: The Art of Design titled "Cas Holman: Design for Play," focusing on his design philosophies.

References

External links
 Official Cas Holman website

Living people
1974 births
Date of birth missing (living people)
Place of birth missing (living people)
American toy industry businesspeople
Toy designers

Rhode Island School of Design faculty